Sir Robert William Hamilton (26 August 1867 – 5 July 1944) was a Scottish Liberal Party politician and Chief Justice of the East Africa Protectorate.

Background
Hamilton was the second son of Sir Robert G. C. Hamilton who was Governor of Tasmania. He was educated at St Paul's School and Trinity Hall, Cambridge, and was called to the Bar at Inner Temple. 
He was knighted in 1918. In 1925 he married Gertrude Williamson of Kirkwall, Orkney.

Professional career
Hamilton was appointed an Assistant Judge of the High Court of East Africa in 1902. Three years later, he was in 1905 appointed Principal Judge and Chief Justice of the East Africa Protectorate. He was appointed as Chairman of the Civil Service Commission in 1918. He retired from the civil service in 1920.

Political career
Hamilton was selected as Liberal candidate for the island constituency of Orkney and Shetland at the 1922 general election. The seat was a safe Liberal seat, where at the previous election Sir Malcolm Smith had been returned unopposed. Smith declared himself a supporter of Lloyd George's Coalition Government and sought re-election in 1922 as a National Liberal Party candidate. The two Liberal factions went head to head and Hamilton won the seat;

He was re-elected at the general election a year later, this time against a Unionist challenger;

In 1924 he was returned at the general election unopposed. At the 1929 General election he was re-elected with a bigger majority;

He served as a Parliamentary delegate to South Africa in 1924, to Canada in 1928 and to Iceland in 1930. From 1930 to 1931 he was a member of the first Round Table Conference formed to discuss plans for Indian independence. In 1931 he served on the Joint Select committee on East Africa. When the Liberal Party split in late 1931, Hamilton followed the group led by Sir Herbert Samuel and the official Liberal Party, in support of the National Government. He became Parliamentary Under-Secretary of State for the Colonies in the National Government in September 1931, working under the Conservative Philip Cunliffe-Lister. At the October general election he was returned unopposed. In 1932 he was replaced as Under-Secretary by the Conservative Ivor Windsor-Clive, 2nd Earl of Plymouth.  When the Liberal Party decided to leave the National Government in 1933, he followed Samuel across to the opposition benches. He was appointed Scottish Liberal Whip in 1934. He lost his seat at the 1935 general election, to the Conservative Party candidate.

He retired from politics and did not stand again.

References

External links 
 

1867 births
1944 deaths
Scottish Liberal Party MPs
Members of the Parliament of the United Kingdom for Orkney and Shetland
UK MPs 1922–1923
UK MPs 1923–1924
UK MPs 1924–1929
UK MPs 1929–1931
UK MPs 1931–1935
Alumni of Trinity Hall, Cambridge
Chief justices of Kenya
East Africa Protectorate judges
British Kenya people